Bol (also known as Rīmdān-e Shāh Valī Moḩammad and Rīmdān Shāh Wali Muhammad) is a village in Sand-e Mir Suiyan Rural District, Dashtiari District, Chabahar County, Sistan and Baluchestan Province, Iran. At the 2006 census, its population was 184, in 36 families.

References 

Populated places in Chabahar County